Nelsonville (formerly Newell and Imlaystown Station) is an unincorporated community located within Upper Freehold Township in Monmouth County, New Jersey, United States. The settlement is located on County Route 526 between Allentown and Imlaystown where it intersects the former Pemberton and Hightstown Railroad. The site was the location of the Newell post office established in 1883 (removed in 1923). The area was originally known as Imlaystown Station as it was the closest spot to the eponymous town along the railroad. In 1887, the area was renamed to Nelsonville for the local postmaster, Charles Nelson. Other industries in the area at the time included a wagon shop and a cider mill. Today, several agricultural and light industries surround the settlement in addition to some single-family homes. The right-of-way of the former railroad is being reconstructed as the Union Transportation Trail.

References

Upper Freehold Township, New Jersey
Unincorporated communities in Monmouth County, New Jersey
Unincorporated communities in New Jersey